WCAC-LD, virtual and UHF digital channel 33, is a low-power independent television station licensed to LaGrange, Georgia, United States. The station is owned by BeeTV Network, LLC. WCAC-LD's transmitter is located on Campbell Street north of downtown La Grange.

The station began broadcasting in 1989 as WJCN-LD.

In 2021, Community Network Television sold WJCN-LD to BeeTV Network, LLC. The founder of BeeTV, April Ross, had interned at the then-WJCN-LD in college and previously worked at WRBL in Columbus, Georgia.

References

External links
 

Television channels and stations established in 1989
1989 establishments in Georgia (U.S. state)
CAC-LD
Low-power television stations in the United States
Companies based in Troup County, Georgia